Éric Deflandre (born 2 August 1973) is a Belgian former professional footballer who played as a right-back.

Club career
Deflandre was born in Rocourt. He first signed to Wandre Union but after one year he joined Liège side RFC Liège. He then left for Germinal Ekeren in 1995.

In 1996, he signed for Club Brugge.

In 2000, Deflandre moved to Olympique Lyonnais in France, where he won three straight national championships.

He returned to Belgium in 2004 and played for Standard Liège.

In 2007–08, he split duty with FC Brussels and F.C. Verbroedering Dender E.H. On 25 June 2009, he for Lierse S.K. on a two-year deal. On 9 August 2010, it was announced he would return to RFC Liège, where he played for two more seasons before retiring.

International career
Deflandre played his debut match for the Belgium national team against The Netherlands in the qualifying stage for the 1998 World Cup. In the competition's first match, he replaced Bertrand Crasson after 22 minutes, and helped to a 0–0 draw against the Netherlands.

He also appeared for the national side at Euro 2000 and 2002 World Cup. In Euro 2000, he substituted as a goalkeeper after Filip de Wilde was sent off against Turkey.

Honours
Club Brugge
Belgian First Division: 1997–98
Belgian Supercup: 1998

Lyon
French First Division: 2001–02, 2002–03, 2003–04
French Supercup: 2003

Belgium
 FIFA Fair Play Trophy: 2002 World Cup

References

External links
  
 
 
 Eric Deflandre at Footgoal.net

1973 births
Living people
Walloon people
Walloon sportspeople
Footballers from Liège
Belgian footballers
Association football fullbacks
Belgium international footballers
RFC Liège players
Beerschot A.C. players
Club Brugge KV players
Olympique Lyonnais players
Standard Liège players
UEFA Euro 2000 players
1998 FIFA World Cup players
2002 FIFA World Cup players
R.W.D.M. Brussels F.C. players
F.C.V. Dender E.H. players
Belgian Pro League players
Ligue 1 players
Belgian expatriate footballers
Belgian expatriate sportspeople in France
Expatriate footballers in France
Outfield association footballers who played in goal